Michael Patrick Gbinije (born June 5, 1992) is a Nigerian-American professional basketball player for the Cape Town Tigers of the Basketball Africa League. He played one season of college basketball for Duke before transferring to Syracuse in 2012. He was drafted 49th overall by the Pistons in the 2016 NBA draft. He has represented the Nigerian national team.

High school career
Gbinije competed for Benedictine High School. As a junior, Gbinije averaged 18.0 points and 6.0 rebounds per game. He averaged 25.0 points, 10.0 rebounds and 5.0 assists as a senior and was named first team all-state. He led Benedictine to a 26–5 record and the VISAA Division I State Championship. Gbinije was ranked 28th in the 2011 class by ESPNU 100 and 26th overall by Scout.com.

College career

Gbinije began his collegiate career at Duke, where he played sparingly as freshman and averaged 1.7 points in 19 games. He opted to transfer to Syracuse after his freshman year and sat out the 2012–13 season as a redshirt. As a sophomore, Gbinije averaged 3.4 points, 1.8 rebounds, and 1.2 assists per game. He increased those numbers to 12.7 points, 5.0 rebounds, and 3.6 assists per game as a junior in 2014–15. On February 14, 2015, he scored a career-high 27 points against Duke to go along with four assists in an 80–72 loss. As a senior in 2015–16, he averaged 17.5 points, 4.1 rebounds, 4.3 assists, and 1.9 steals per game while shooting 39% from beyond the three-point line and 46% overall. Gbinije started all 37 games of the season and helped lead the Orange on an improbable run to the 2016 NCAA Final Four.

Professional career

Detroit Pistons (2016–2017)
On June 23, 2016, Gbinije was selected by the Detroit Pistons with the 49th overall pick in the 2016 NBA draft. He was drafted for his defense, versatility and athleticism. On July 3, 2016, he suffered a sprained ankle and was ruled out for the entire 2016 NBA Summer League. Despite the injury, he signed with the Pistons on July 14. During his rookie season, Gbinije had multiple assignments with the Grand Rapids Drive, the Pistons' D-League affiliate. On July 15, 2017, he was waived by the Pistons.

Santa Cruz Warriors (2017–2019)
On September 6, 2017, Gbinije signed a training camp deal with the Golden State Warriors and appeared in 4 preseason games. He was waived by the Warriors on October 14, 2017. A couple days later, Gbinije was then signed with the Santa Cruz Warriors in the NBA G League.

On June 29, 2018, the Knicks announced that Gbinije  would be on their summer league team.

Mitteldeutscher BC (2019–2020)
On July 17, 2019, Gbinije signed with Mitteldeutscher BC of the Basketball Bundesliga. In 17 games, he averaged 11.2 points, 2.5 rebounds, 2.1 assists and 1.1 steals per game.

BC Nevėžis (2020)
On February 13, 2020, Gbinije signed with BC Nevėžis of the Lithuanian league.

Oklahoma City Blue (2021–2022)
Gbinije was selected with the ninth pick in the 2021 NBA G League draft by the Iowa Wolves. He was traded to the Oklahoma City Blue for a pair of later-round picks. He was then later waived on January 31, 2022.

Return to OKC Blue (2022)
On February 10, 2022, Gbinije was reacquired and activated by the Oklahoma City Blue. Gbinije was then later waived on March 4, 2022. Gbinije was reacquired on March 6, 2022.

Cape Town Tigers (2022–present) 
On October 17, 2022, it was announced Gbinije had signed with the South African team Cape Town Tigers for the 2022–23 season.

NBA career statistics

Regular season

|-
| align="left" | 
| align="left" | Detroit
| 9 || 0 || 3.6 || .100 || .000 || 1.000 || .3 || .2 || .0 || .0 || .4
|- 
| style="text-align:center;" colspan="2"| Career
| 9 || 0 || 3.6 || .100 || .000 || 1.000 || .3 || .2 || .0 || .0 || .4

National team career
Gbinije competed on the Nigerian squad in AfroBasket 2015 because his father, Frank, is a native of Nigeria. He helped Nigeria win gold in the tournament and qualify for the 2016 Summer Olympics, scoring five points in the championship game against Angola. "Playing on this team was a unique experience for me," he said. "Overall, I enjoyed playing with these guys." Overall, Gbinije averaged 7.3 points and 2.1 rebounds per game in the tournament and scored in double figures twice in eight games.

Personal life
He is the son of Frank, an All-American soccer player at Temple, and Yvette Gbinije. He enrolled in the College of Visual and Performing Arts and majored in communication and rhetorical studies.

References

External links

Syracuse Orange bio

1992 births
Living people
American expatriate basketball people in Germany
American expatriate basketball people in Lithuania
American men's basketball players
American sportspeople of Nigerian descent
Basketball players at the 2016 Summer Olympics
Basketball players from Hartford, Connecticut
Basketball players from Richmond, Virginia
BC Nevėžis players
Detroit Pistons draft picks
Detroit Pistons players
Duke Blue Devils men's basketball players
Grand Rapids Drive players
Mitteldeutscher BC players
Nigerian expatriate basketball people in Germany
Nigerian expatriate sportspeople in South Africa
Nigerian men's basketball players
Oklahoma City Blue players
Olympic basketball players of Nigeria
Santa Cruz Warriors players
Shooting guards
Small forwards
Syracuse Orange men's basketball players
Cape Town Tigers players